Double-muscled cattle refers to breeds of cattle that carry one of seven known mutations that limits and reduces the activity of the myostatin protein.  Normally, myostatin limits the number of muscle fibers present at birth, and interfering with activity of this protein causes animals to be born with higher numbers of muscle fibers, consequently augmenting muscle growth. Additionally, these mutations reduce the superficial and internal fat deposits, causing the meat to be less marbled and lower in fat content.  Animals homozygous for myostatin mutation (inheriting a mutant copy of myostatin from both sire and dam) also have improved meat tenderness in some cuts of meat.  The enlarged muscles of dam and calf at birth leads to increased difficulty of calving, and in some breeds frequently necessitates birth by cesarean section.

History 

Some breeds of cattle do not possess the myostatin gene that helps regulate muscle growth. This causes them to have more muscle mass and yields more meat for the cattle farmers. Two of the breeds that possess the double muscle gene are the Piedmontese and the Parthenais. The Piedmontese was discovered in Italy 1897, and the Parthenais were found in France in 1893. The Belgian Blue is another cattle that can lack myostatin and have double muscles. The Belgian Blue originates from central and upper Belgium. The breed was established in the early 20th century. The Belgian Blue was once divided into two strains, one for beef and the other for milk. The Belgian Blue is now primarily beef. The Belgian Blue is relatively new to the U.S. but has gained acceptance from breeders.

Myostatin was discovered by Se-Jin Lee and Alexander McPherron in 1997. They found that myostatin was lacking in mice and causes the size of the mice to increase by two or three times the size of mice that did not lack the myostatin. Later that year McPherron and Lee also saw that Piedmontese and Belgian Blue cattle were hypermuscular. The cattle had naturally occurring disruption of myostatin locus. Lee went on to extensively study myostatin. During this research he noted the loss of white fat that occurred when hyper muscularity by myostatin would happen. He also showed that myostatin was sufficient to cause a phenotype reminiscent of cachexia. "Dr. Lee has shown that other molecules in the TGF-B pathways, notably the activins and follistatin, also regulate muscle mass." Lee's contributions also demonstrated so potential that myostatin could be therapeutic, the clinical setting that myostatin blockade would be useful has not yet been found but it may be beneficial in some areas. People are now trying to use myostatin as a medicine. "The research has produced several muscle-building drugs now being tested in people with medical problems, including muscular dystrophy, cancer and kidney disease."

Double-muscled breeding is done to get more meat and less fat. Backfat is generally found to be less in double-muscled cattle than in cattle with normal muscling. Animals that are double-muscled have a higher carcass yield but this does come with new problems for the cattle. The meat from double muscled cattle is tenderer. "There is a persisting trend to improve carcass quality in specialized beef breeds. A higher meat yield and more lean meat are desirable for the meat industry."

Controversy
The enlarged muscles of dam and calf at birth leads to increased difficulty of calving, and in some breeds frequently necessitates birth by cesarean section.  Affected breeds include:

 Belgian Blue
 Piedmontese
 Parthenais
 Maine Anjou
 Limousin

See also
 Myostatin
 Cattle

References

Further reading

Cattle